Primary cutaneous coccidioidomycosis is a skin condition caused by Coccidioides immitis following a definite history of inoculation or a colonized splinter found in the skin lesion.

See also 
 Coccidioidomycosis
 List of cutaneous conditions

References 

Mycosis-related cutaneous conditions